New Hampshire is a HuffPost Originals documentary miniseries. It is a seven-part series chronicling the New Hampshire primary of the 2016 U.S. presidential election.

People featured 
The series features exclusive content and interviews with numerous politicians, journalists, and voters involved with the primary, including: 
 Chris Christie, Republican presidential candidate and New Jersey governor
 Jackie Alemany, CBS News correspondent
 Bill Gardner, New Hampshire Secretary of State
 Lindsey Graham, Republican presidential candidate and U.S. Senator from South Carolina
 Kelly Ayotte, Republican U.S. Senator from New Hampshire
 Jason Freeman, Republican Tracker
 Charlie Pearce, Christie campaign official
 John Kasich, Republican presidential candidate and Ohio governor
 Jeb Bush, Republican presidential candidate and former Florida governor
 Bernie Sanders, Democratic presidential candidate and U.S. Senator from Vermont
 Kriss Belvins, make-up artist
 Christopher Hickey, EMS training officer
 Voters in Recovery; Electra Delano, Jessica Wheeler, Jeff Douley, Dennis Dutra
 Mike Gamanche, District Chief of the Manchester Fire Department
 Michael Leafe, Manchester Fire Department
New Hampshire voters featured include Belinda Phillips, Laura Smith, Mary Donnelly, David Chick (from Vermont)

Episodes

References 

2016 American television series debuts